Malela Mutuale (born June 18, 1991, in Decines-Charpieu, France) is a French basketball player for Orléans Loiret of the LNB Pro B.

References

1991 births
Living people
Black French sportspeople
French sportspeople of Democratic Republic of the Congo descent
French men's basketball players
Orléans Loiret Basket players
People from Décines-Charpieu
Point guards
STB Le Havre players
Sportspeople from Lyon Metropolis